The Swellendam Local Municipality council consists of eleven members elected by mixed-member proportional representation. Six councillors are elected by first-past-the-post voting in six wards, while the remaining five are chosen from party lists so that the total number of party representatives is proportional to the number of votes received. In the election of 1 November 2021, the Democratic Alliance (DA) retained its majority of six seats on the council.

Results 
The following table shows the composition of the council after past elections.

December 2000 election

The following table shows the results of the 2000 election.

October 2002 floor crossing

In terms of the Eighth Amendment of the Constitution and the judgment of the Constitutional Court in United Democratic Movement v President of the Republic of South Africa and Others, in the period from 8–22 October 2002 councillors had the opportunity to cross the floor to a different political party without losing their seats.

In the Swellendam council, three councillors from the Democratic Alliance (DA) crossed to the New National Party (NNP), which had formerly been part of the DA.

By-elections from October 2002 to August 2004
The following by-elections were held to fill vacant ward seats in the period between the floor crossing periods in October 2002 and September 2004.

September 2004 floor crossing
Another floor-crossing period occurred on 1–15 September 2004, in which the remaining NNP councillor crossed to the ANC.

March 2006 election

The following table shows the results of the 2006 election.

September 2007 floor crossing
The final floor-crossing period occurred on 1–15 September 2007; floor-crossing was subsequently abolished in 2008 by the Fifteenth Amendment of the Constitution. In the Swellendam council, one councillor from the African National Congress crossed to the Independent Democrats.

May 2011 election

The following table shows the results of the 2011 election.

By-elections from May 2011 to August 2016
The following by-elections were held to fill vacant ward seats in the period between the elections in May 2011 and August 2016.

August 2016 election

The following table shows the results of the 2016 election.

In a by-election held on 24 July 2019, the DA managed to win a ward from the ANC.

The council was reconfigured as seen below:

The local council sends one representative, a member of the Democratic Alliance, to the council of the Overberg District Municipality.

November 2021 election

The following table shows the results of the 2021 election.

Notes

References

Swellendam
Elections in the Western Cape
Overberg District Municipality